Vinicius Jatobá is a Brazilian writer. He was born in 1980 in Rio de Janeiro. He holds a PhD in comparative literature. He writes in a variety of genres including fiction, essays and plays. His stories have been translated into English, German, French and Spanish. His theatre sketches have been produced in Brazil and in Europe. 

In 2012, he was chosen as one of the Best of Young Brazilian Novelists by Granta Magazine. However, Jatoba has not produced any novels in the decade since, and he has spoken of an aversion to the novelistic form since. He has written and directed several short films, including Alta Solidão (2010) and Vida entre os mamíferos (2011).

References

Brazilian writers